Stephan Clyde 'Vlooi' Kotzé (born 21 January 1991) is a South African rugby union player who most recently played for  in the Currie Cup competition.

He was also a member of the South Africa Under-20 squad during the 2011 IRB Junior World Championship.

References

1991 births
Living people
Afrikaner people
Free State Cheetahs players
Pumas (Currie Cup) players
Rugby union players from Kimberley, Northern Cape
Rugby union props
South Africa Under-20 international rugby union players
South African rugby union players